Dunlop Parish  is a civil parish, of Yanda County, a cadasteral division of New South Wales;  a Cadastral division of New South Wales.

Location
The Parish is on the Darling River upstream of Wilcannia, New South Wales and down stream of Bourke, New South Wales.

The only town of the parish is Louth, New South Wales.

Geography
The topography is flat with a Köppen climate classification of BsK (Hot semi arid).

The economy in the parish is  based on broad acre agriculture, mainly Wheat, and sheep.

The Dunlop Ranges are in the parish.

History
The traditional owners of the area are the Barkindji people, 
The first European to the area was Thomas Mitchell (explorer).

In 1859 when Thomas Andrew Mathews, an Irish immigrant from County Louth, built a pub to serve the passing trade along the Darling River.

In 1888 the first mechanised shearing of sheep, in the world, took place at Sir Samuel McCaughey's Dunlop Station.

External links
Charles Bayliss,  View from Dunlop Range, near Louth, Darling River looking south (1886).
Charles. Bayliss,   Homestead, Dunlop Station, Darling River (1886) , National Gallery of Victoria, Melbourne.

References

Central West (New South Wales)
Localities in New South Wales
Geography of New South Wales
Populated places in New South Wales